Xing is a cultural organization based in Bologna, Italy, dedicated to the production and support of experimental practices within the arts. Xing was founded in 2000 by Daniele Gasparinetti, Silvia Fanti, Andrea Lissoni, Giovanna Amadasi and Federica Rossi. Their research focuses in particular on the field of live arts, performing arts and electronic arts.

Activities 
From 2000 to 2011, Xing organized in Bologna the festivals Netmage - International Live Media Festival, dedicated to electronic art and live media, and F.I.S.Co Festival Internazionale sullo Spettacolo Contemporaneo, dedicated to performing arts. Since 2012, the two festivals merged in the project Live Arts Week, an annual event dedicated to live arts, taking place in different locations in the city for ten editions (2012-2021). In 2021 Xing launched a vinyl-only record label of works by both Italian and international personalities linked to live performativity, entitled Xong. Since 2003, Xing has been curating a continuous programme in its space in Bologna, Raum  and in Milan, Lima (active 2003-2006).

Publications 
Fanti, Silvia (Xing), ed. (2003). Corpo sottile. Uno sguardo sulla nuova coreografia europea (Jérôme Bel, Xavier Le Roy, Myriam Gourfink, Kinkaleri, MK). Milano: Ubulibri. 
Xing (2002). Italian Landscapes. Roma: Luca Sossella Editore. 
Link Project/Xing (2000). Netmage - Piccola Enciclopedia dell’immaginario tecnologico. Milano: Mondadori. 
Contributions:
 Caleo Ilenia, Di Matteo Piersandra, Sacchi Annalisa (2021). In fiamme. La performance nello spazio delle lotte (1967-1979). Venezia: bruno. 
 Silvia Fanti, Daniele Gasparinetti (Xing). "Piattaforme fluttuanti," in Sarah Cosulich, Stefano Collicelli Cagol (eds.). Quadriennale d'arte 2020 FUORI. Roma: Treccani. 
Benassi, Riccardo (2020). Morestalgia. Roma: Nero editions. 
 Canedicoda (2018). Adagio con buccia. Roma: Nero editions. 
 Vascellari, Nico (2018). Codalunga (2015-2018). Roma: Nero editions. 
 Invernomuto (2012). Simone. Milano: Mousse publishing. 
 Malzacher Florian, Tupajić Tea, Zanki Petra (eds.). Curating Performing Arts. #1 FRAKCJIA "Performing Arts Journal". No. 55, 2010.

Further reading 
 Caliri, Gaspare (2020). Everyday Life Practice. Nero editions.
 Editorial Staff (2020). Nostalgia After the Internet. Nero editions.
 Bordignon, Elena (2020). Arte Fiera 2020 / Opla'. ATP Diary.
 Gatti, Tommaso (2019). Live Arts Week Bologna. Flash Art.
 Editorial Staff (2019). Here it is elsewhere. Nero editions.
 Monteanni, Luigi (2018). Alternative Intelligence and Radical Computer Music: Goodiepal’s intricate existentialism. Mousse Magazine.
 Bertuzzi, Simone (2018). Dieselpunk per famiglie. Nero editions.
 Giraud, Claudia (2018). 15 Anni di Xing a Bologna. Riparte a Raum la stagione delle arti performative (e visive). Artribune.
 Granato, Paola (2018). La forma della performance. Exibart.
 Tenaglia, Francesco (2018). Dalla miniera al Rave. Nero editions.
 Piselli, Guendalina (2018). Report: Live Arts Week 2018 / A prova di sensi…. ATP Diary.
 Solari, Mattia (2017). Un delirio di suoni e di corpi alla 'Live Arts Week' di Bologna. Vice.
 Editorial Staff (2014). Interview with Maria Hassabi, PREMIERE. ATP Diary.
 Viola, Serena (2012). Live Arts Week a Bologna. Performance tra decelerazione e accelerazione. Il Fatto Quotidiano.

References

External links 
 http://www.xing.it/
 http://www.liveartsweek.it 
 http://www.bolognacontemporanea.it/

Contemporary art organizations
New media art
Performance art
New media art festivals
2000 establishments in Italy
Organisations based in Bologna